The Bezirk Dresden was a district (Bezirk) of East Germany that lasted from 1952 to 1990. Dresden would be reabsorbed back into Saxony after the reunification of Germany. The administrative seat and the main town was Dresden.

History
The district was established, with the other 13, on 25 July 1952, substituting the old German states. After 3 October 1990 it was disestablished upon German reunification, becoming again part of the state of Saxony.

Geography

Position
The Bezirk Dresden was the easternmost Bezirk of East Germany. It, bordered on the 'Bezirke' of Cottbus, Leipzig and Karl-Marx-Stadt, as well as on Czechoslovakia and Poland. It was broadly similar in area to the later Direktionsbezirk Dresden, which functioned from 1990 to 2012.

Subdivision
The Bezirk was divided into 17 Kreise: 2 urban districts (Stadtkreise) and 15 rural districts (Landkreise): 
Urban districts : Dresden; Görlitz.
Rural districts : Bautzen; Bischofswerda; Dippoldiswalde; Dresden-Land; Freital; Görlitz; Großenhain; Kamenz; Löbau; Meißen; Niesky; Pirna; Riesa; Sebnitz; Zittau.

See also
Direktionsbezirk Dresden
Administrative divisions of East Germany
Bezirk Karl-Marx-Stadt
Bezirk Leipzig

References

External links

Dresden
Bezirk Dresden
History of Dresden